, known in Europe as Eldar Saga, is an action role-playing game developed by K2 and released for the Wii. It is the third installment of the Valhalla Knights series. Valhalla Knights: Eldar Saga was released on September 29, 2009 in North America, October 8 in Japan and September 17, 2010 in Europe.

Gameplay

Plot

Development
Valhalla Knights: Eldar Saga was released for the Nintendo Wii.

Reception 
Valhalla Knights: Eldar Saga received generally unfavorable reviews according to review aggregator Metacritic.

References

External links
Official Japanese website 
Official North American Website

Role-playing video games
Marvelous Entertainment
Nintendo Wi-Fi Connection games
Wii-only games
Wii Wi-Fi games
Wii games
Video games scored by Motoi Sakuraba
Video games developed in Japan
Video games featuring female protagonists
2009 video games
Rising Star Games games
Multiplayer and single-player video games
Xseed Games games